James C. Humes (31 October 1934 – 21 August 2020) was an author and former presidential speechwriter. 

Humes was born in Williamsport, Pennsylvania on 31 October, 1934 to Samuel and Elenor (née Graham) Humes. At age 19 he attend the Stowe School on scholarship where he met Winston Churchill who advised him, “Young man, study history. In history lie all the secrets of statecraft.”  After graduation from Williams College he attended law school at George Washington University.  While still in law school he wrote speeches for then-President Dwight Eisenhower. He served one term in the Pennsylvania House of Representatives 1963-1965 representing Lycoming county.

Humes, along with William Safire and Pat Buchanan, is credited for authoring the text on the Apollo 11 lunar plaque. Humes has written many books sharing his extensive knowledge of the modern history and political landscape.

Selected works
 
 The Wit and Wisdom of Abraham Lincoln: A Book of Quotations, 2005
 Speak Like Churchill, Stand Like Lincoln: 21 Powerful Secrets of History's Greatest Speakers, 2002
 The Wit & Wisdom of Ronald Reagan, 2007
 The Wit & Wisdom of Benjamin Franklin, 2001
 The Wit & Wisdom of Winston Churchill: A Treasury of More Than 1,000 Quotations and Anecdotes, 1994
 The Sir Winston Method: The Five Secrets of Speaking the Language of Leadership, 1991
 Confessions of a White House Ghostwriter: Five presidents and Other Political Adventures, 1997
 Eisenhower and Churchill: The Partnership That Saved the World, 2001
 How to Get Invited to the White House ... and Over One Hundred Impressive Gambits, Foxy Face-Savers, and Clever Maneuvers, 1977
 Instant Eloquence; A Lazy Man's Guide to Public Speaking, 1985
 Nixon's Ten Commandments of Statecraft: His Guiding Principles of Leadership and Negotiation, 1997 (Simon & Schuster)
 Churchill: The Prophetic Statesman, 2012 (Regnery Publishing)

References

External links
 

Living people
Nixon administration personnel
American speechwriters
Williams College alumni
The Hill School alumni
1934 births
People educated at Stowe School